2088: The Cryllan Mission is a 1989 video game published by Victory Software for the Apple IIgs.

Gameplay
2088: The Cryllan Mission is a game in which a new spacecraft crew must find out what happened to the U.S.S. Houston on the planet Crylla.

Reception
Dennis Owens reviewed the game for Computer Gaming World, and stated that "Overall, 2088: The Cryllan Mission marks a promising entrance into the still underdeveloped market of IIGS-specific software by a new company."

Reviews
The Apple IIGS Buyers Guide Winter 1990
inCider
Nibble

References

1989 video games
Apple IIGS games
Apple IIGS-only games
Role-playing video games
Science fiction video games
Video games developed in the United States
Video games set in the 2080s